William Cannon (March 15, 1809 – March 1, 1865) was an American merchant and politician from Bridgeville, in Sussex County, Delaware. He was a member of the Democratic Party and later the Republican Party, who served in the Delaware General Assembly and as Governor of Delaware during much of the Civil War.

Early life and family
Cannon was born at Bridgeville, in Sussex County, Delaware, son of Josiah and Nancy Bowlin Cannon. He married Margaret Ann Barker and had six children. He began working in his father's merchandising business in Bridgeville, and gradually expanded it to include lumber, grain, grist and saw mills, and a brick yard. His business interests included peaches, banking, and newspaper publishing, and he was a director of the Delaware Railroad. By 1864 he was probably the wealthiest man in Sussex County.

Cannon's eldest son, William Laws Cannon (1839–1863), served in the Union Army during the Civil War.  He was the captain of Company E of the First Delaware Cavalry. The younger William died of exposure in 1863 during the Gettysburg Campaign.

Governor of Delaware
Cannon was elected as a Democrat to the state house for the 1845/46 session and the 1847/48 session. From 1849 until 1851 he was state treasurer. Although he had been a leader in the a Democratic Party prior to the 1862 elections, at that time he switched parties and became a Republican, who were organized as the Union Party for this election. Perhaps the switch resulted from his devotion to the Union, but it also may have been due to a three time failure to receive the Democratic nomination for governor. In the months leading up to the 1862 elections Cannon and incumbent U.S. Representative George P. Fisher feared they would be defeated by a combination of so many Republican voters off serving in the U.S. Army, and polling place shenanigans by stay at home Democrats. Their solution was to request federal troops to monitor the voting places. The troops came, supervised the election, and Cannon was elected, defeating Democrat Samuel Jefferson from New Castle County. However, Fisher lost, and Cannon faced a General Assembly with a Democratic majority in both houses.

This majority was furious with the new governor. Besides despising him for switching parties and supporting the hated abolitionists, they thought he had virtually won his office at the point of a bayonet. The State House refused to allow Cannon the use of its facilities for his inauguration, and a joint committee of the General Assembly said his inaugural message was not only impertinent, but insolent in the extreme, entirely unbecoming a State Executive, especially one elected by "fraud and violence against the known wish of a majority of the citizens of Delaware." Then the whole affair was repeated a year later, when federal troops supervised a special election to fill the seat of deceased U.S. Representative William Temple. This time the Democrats boycotted the election, but they were just biding their time. Finally, once again the elections of 1864 were supervised by federal troops, but this time the Democrats voted and swept the election. Without the veto, Cannon was powerless to accomplish anything with the General Assembly. As if to emphasize the point the General Assembly even rejected Cannon's request to approve the Thirteenth Amendment, prohibiting slavery. This act had been approved by neighboring border state Maryland, but Delaware's Democrats would refuse to pass this measure for another generation.

Cannon served as Governor of Delaware from January 20, 1863 until his death while in office on March 1, 1865. He had become ill, some said, after helping to extinguish a fire. He was almost 56 years old and the eighth governor to die in office.

Death and legacy
Cannon died at Bridgeville, Delaware, and was buried there in the Bridgeville Methodist Cemetery. His son Philip L. Cannon became the first Lieutenant Governor of Delaware in 1901.

Electoral history
Elections are held on the first Tuesday after November 1. Members of the Delaware General Assembly took office in the first Tuesday of January. State representatives have a term of two years. The governor takes office the third Tuesday in January, and has a four-year term.

References

Further reading

Images
Hall of Governors Portrait Gallery; Portrait courtesy of Historical and Cultural Affairs, Dover

Places with more information
Delaware Historical Society; website; 505 North Market Street, Wilmington, Delaware 19801; (302) 655-7161
University of Delaware; Library website; 181 South College Avenue, Newark, Delaware 19717; (302) 831-2965

External links
National Governors Association
Biographical Directory of the Governors of the United States
Delaware’s Governors

The Political Graveyard
The Cannons of Delaware and Maryland

1809 births
1865 deaths
Methodists from Delaware
People from Bridgeville, Delaware
People of Delaware in the American Civil War
Businesspeople from Delaware
Delaware Democrats
Delaware Republicans
State treasurers of Delaware
Members of the Delaware House of Representatives
Governors of Delaware
Burials in Sussex County, Delaware
Republican Party governors of Delaware
Union (American Civil War) state governors
19th-century American politicians